Where Are They Now? is a television show that aired on Australia's Seven Network. It was hosted by David Koch, presenter of Seven's breakfast television program Sunrise and former Sunrise co-host Melissa Doyle. It is a revival of a previous show of the same name hosted by Peter Luck in 1997.

Premise
The program looks back at particular periods in recent history with a specific slant towards major events and popular culture, with a focus on Australian life at the time. Along with edited segments, each show features studio interviews with noted figures and celebrities who have seemingly ended their 15 minutes of fame and gone into obscurity, leading the presenters to ask them the question, "where are they now?". 

Cast reunions such as bringing together and reuniting the cast of serial Sons and Daughters including Rowena Wallace, Peter Phelps (played John Palmer), Ally Fowler (played Angela Hamilton), Tom Richards (played David Palmer), Ian Rawlings (played Wayne Hamilton) and Belinda Giblin (played Alloison Carr) are also common segments on the show. Numerous episodes also revisited guests and stories previously featured on Peter Luck's 1997 version.

Broadcast
Where Are They Now? debuted on Sunday night at 6:30pm in February 2006 to high ratings. The show went on hiatus from June to early August 2006 to make way for the celebrity singing competition It Takes Two, but returned to the same time slot after the finale of that series.

Where Are They Now? returned for a second series in May 2007, and a one-off episode aired on 16 November 2008.

References

External links
 

Seven Network original programming
Australian non-fiction television series
2006 Australian television series debuts
2008 Australian television series endings